Coqen may refer to:

Coqên County, county in Tibet
Coqên Town, a town in Tibet